Fleagle may refer to:


People 

Brick Fleagle, an American jazz guitarist
John G. Fleagle, an American anthropologist
Patrick Fleagle, a US State Representative
Fleagle Gang, the American bank robbers